Balraj Khanna (born 1940) is an Indian author and painter. Born in Punjab, India, he has lived in England and France since 1965.

Bibliography
The Punjab and the Punjabi Way of Life, Commonwealth Institute, 1976
Nation of Fools, Michael Joseph Ltd, 1984
Sweet Chillies, Constable, 1991
Art of Modern India, Thames & Hudson Ltd, 1999
Krishna: The Divine Lover, National Touring Exhibitions, 1999
Human and Divine: 2000 Years of Indian Sculpture (with George Michell), National Touring Exhibitions, 1999
Indian Magic, Hope Road Publishing Ltd, 2014
Line of Blood, Palimpsest Publishers, 2017

References 

20th-century Indian writers
21st-century Indian writers
Writers from Punjab, India
Indian expatriates in France
Indian expatriates in the United Kingdom
1940 births
Living people